Xiangzi may refer to:

Posthumous names
Zhi Yao (died 453 BC), also known as Xiangzi of Zhi, ruler of Zhi during the Spring and Autumn period
Zhao Wuxu (died 425 BC), also known as Xiangzi of Zhao, head of the House of Zhao in Jin during the Spring and Autumn period
Wei Manduo ( 4th century BC), also known as Xiangzi of Wei, ruler of Wei during the Warring States period

Others
Han Xiangzi,  Chinese mythological figure and one of the Eight Immortals
Xiangzi, the protagonist of Rickshaw Boy by Lao She
The Case, 2007 Chinese film
Xiangzi, narrow alleys in Chinese cities, see Hutong and Longtang